Tej Pratap Yadav (born 16 April 1988) is an Indian politician and  cabinet minister of Environment, Forest & Climate Change Department in the Government of Bihar. He was MLA of Bihar Legislative Assembly from the Mahua constituency as a member of the Rashtriya Janata Dal (RJD) from 2015 to 2020.

Tej Pratap Yadav is the elder son of former Chief Ministers of Bihar, Lalu Prasad Yadav and Rabri Devi.

Early life 
Tej Pratap Yadav was born on 16 April 1988 in Patna. He is the elder son among the seven daughters and two sons of two former Chief Ministers of Bihar, Lalu Prasad Yadav and his wife Rabri Devi. His 7 sisters are Misa Bharti, Rohini, Chanda, Ragini, Hema, Anushka and Raj Lakshmi Yadav. Tejashwi Yadav is his younger brother.

Described as "Behrupiya (a man of many disguises)", he  was said to be "turning spiritual and loves to wander around aimlessly." In 2018, he was seen "overlooking a large herd of cattle in Barsana at the Mataji Goshala, said to be one of the largest cow shelters in the world with over 25,000 cows."

Personal life
He was married to Aishwarya Rai, daughter of Chandrika Roy and granddaughter of Bihar's ex-Chief Minister Daroga Prasad Rai. He has been accused by his wife of beating her and using drugs, and also of cross-dressing. According to the Times of India report, one of his grouses against his wife is that "she has not been able to adjust to his way of life."

Political career
He became a Cabinet Minister of Health in Nitish Kumar's government from November 2015 until July 2017. In December 2015, as the Environment Minister of Bihar, he promoted horse-riding as an initiative to curb pollution in the state.

The marital discord between Yadav and Aishwarya Rai, daughter of Chandrika Roy, resulted into political "subplot in fight for Parsa seat" of Bihar Assembly, in 2020. Aishwarya also urged the public to vote for CM Nitish Kumar, who is a key political rival of her husband's family.

Controversy
In 2017, Tej Pratap Yadav threatened to skin Prime Minister Narendra Modi alive after Lalu Prasad's security was downgraded from Z+ to Z. Lalu defended his son over this. On the last day of voting in the 2019 general elections, a video of an alleged assault on a video journalist by his bodyguards went viral, while Yadav lodged an FIR calling it a conspiracy to kill him.

References

Living people
Rashtriya Janata Dal politicians
Bihar MLAs 2015–2020
Tej Pratap
1989 births
Bihar MLAs 2020–2025